Clayton Park West is a provincial electoral district in  Nova Scotia, Canada, that elects one member of the Nova Scotia House of Assembly.

The riding was created in 1978 as Halifax Bedford Basin from a portion of Halifax Cobequid. In 2003, the district lost a northern area to Bedford and was renamed Halifax Clayton Park. Following the 2012 electoral boundary review, the district was renamed Clayton Park West. It gained Birch Cove and Kearney Lake areas from Bedford-Birch Cove and the Kearney Lake area from Hammonds Plains-Upper Sackville. It lost the Susies Lake and Quarrie Lake areas to Timberlea-Prospect; the areas south of Mount Saint Vincent University and Lacewood Drive as well as the Washmill Lake Drive area the Fairview-Clayton Park.

Geography

Members of the Legislative Assembly
This riding has elected the following Members of the Legislative Assembly:

Election results

1978 general election

1981 general election

1984 general election

1988 general election

1993 general election

1998 general election

1999 general election

2003 general election

2006 general election

2009 general election

2013 general election 

|-

|Liberal
|Diana Whalen
|align="right"|5,569
|align="right"|67.48
|align="right"|N/A
|-

|New Democratic Party
|Blake Wright
|align="right"|1,448
|align="right"|17.55
|align="right"|N/A
|-

|Progressive Conservative
|Jaime D. Allen
|align="right"|1,236
|align="right"|14.98
|align="right"|N/A
|-
|}

2017 general election

2021 general election

References

External links
Elections Nova Scotia - Summary Results from 1867 to 2011 (PDF)
 2013 riding profile
2003 riding profile
2006 Poll by Poll Results
2003 Poll by Poll Results

Politics of Halifax, Nova Scotia
Nova Scotia provincial electoral districts
2012 establishments in Nova Scotia